The 2002–03 NBA season was the 14th season the Timberwolves has competed in the National Basketball Association. During the off-season, the Timberwolves signed free agents Troy Hudson and Kendall Gill. Kevin Garnett performed well throughout the season, winning the All-Star MVP award in the 2003 NBA All-Star Game in Atlanta, and finishing second in MVP voting behind MVP Tim Duncan with 43 first-place votes, plus also finishing in third place in Defensive Player of the Year voting. Despite losing both Terrell Brandon and Felipe Lopez for the entire season to knee injuries, the Timberwolves posted a 12–1 record in February, held a 29–20 record at the All-Star break, and finished the season with a 51–31 record, good enough to earn the fourth seed in the Western Conference and home court advantage for the playoffs.

Garnett averaged 23.0 points, 13.4 rebounds, 6.0 assists, 1.4 steals and 1.6 blocks per game, and was named to the All-NBA First Team, and the NBA All-Defensive First Team. In addition, Wally Szczerbiak averaged 17.6 points per game, while Hudson provided the team with 14.2 points and 5.7 assists per game, Rasho Nesterovic provided with 11.2 points, 6.5 rebounds and 1.5 blocks per game, and Joe Smith contributed 7.5 points and 5.0 rebounds per game.

However, for the seventh straight year in the Garnett era, the Timberwolves did not make it out of the first round of the playoffs, as they lost to the 5th-seeded and the defending champion Los Angeles Lakers in six games in the Western Conference First Round. Following the season, Smith was traded to the Milwaukee Bucks, while Anthony Peeler signed as a free agent with the Sacramento Kings, Gill signed with the Chicago Bulls, and Brandon was traded to the Atlanta Hawks.

Draft picks

Roster

Roster Notes 
 Point guard Terrell Brandon missed the entire season due to a knee injury.
 Shooting guard Felipe Lopez missed the entire season due to a torn ACL and MCL in his left knee.

Regular season

Season standings

z - clinched division title
y - clinched division title
x - clinched playoff spot

Record vs. opponents

Game log

Playoffs

|- align="center" bgcolor="#ffcccc"
| 1
| April 20
| L.A. Lakers
| L 98–117
| Kevin Garnett (23)
| Kevin Garnett (14)
| Kevin Garnett (7)
| Target Center17,097
| 0–1
|- align="center" bgcolor="#ccffcc"
| 2
| April 22
| L.A. Lakers
| W 119–91
| Troy Hudson (37)
| Kevin Garnett (20)
| Troy Hudson (10)
| Target Center17,132
| 1–1
|- align="center" bgcolor="#ccffcc"
| 3
| April 24
| @ L.A. Lakers
| W 114–110 (OT)
| Kevin Garnett (33)
| Kevin Garnett (14)
| Rod Strickland (7)
| Staples Center18,997
| 2–1
|- align="center" bgcolor="#ffcccc"
| 4
| April 27
| @ L.A. Lakers
| L 97–102
| Garnett, Hudson (28)
| Kevin Garnett (18)
| Kevin Garnett (5)
| Staples Center18,997
| 2–2
|- align="center" bgcolor="#ffcccc"
| 5
| April 29
| L.A. Lakers
| L 90–120
| Kevin Garnett (25)
| Kevin Garnett (16)
| Troy Hudson (7)
| Target Center20,098
| 2–3
|- align="center" bgcolor="#ffcccc"
| 6
| May 1
| @ L.A. Lakers
| L 85–101
| Garnett, Hudson (18)
| Kevin Garnett (12)
| Garnett, Szczerbiak (5)
| Staples Center18,997
| 2–4
|-

Player statistics

Season

Playoffs

Awards and records
 Kevin Garnett, All-NBA First Team
 Kevin Garnett, NBA All-Defensive First Team
 Kevin Garnett, NBA All-Star Game Most Valuable Player Award

Transactions

References

See also
 2002-03 NBA season

Minnesota Timberwolves seasons
2002 in sports in Minnesota
2003 in sports in Minnesota
Monnesota